Crossed out may refer to:
Strikethrough, lines or crosses drawn over text like this
Crossed Out, a band